Lieutenant General William Frederick Scarlett, 3rd Baron Abinger  (30 August 1826 – 16 January 1892), was a British peer and soldier.

Education
Lord Abinger was educated at Eton College and Trinity College, Cambridge.

Military career
He became a Captain of the Scots Fusilier Guards regiment of the British Army. He served in the Crimean War fighting between 1854 and 1855 in the battles of Alma, Balaclava and Inkerman.

Scarlett succeeded his father Robert Scarlett, 2nd Baron Abinger, in 1861.  He visited the United States during the American Civil War He was promoted to Major in 1868, with promotions through the ranks at intervals of six, three and five years.

In the 1877 Birthday Honours, Lord Abinger was appointed to the Order of the Bath as a Companion (CB).

Family
In 1863, he married Helen Magruder, daughter of Commodore George Allan Magruder, of the United States Navy, and niece of John B. Magruder. They had one son, James and two daughters, Ella, who studied medicine at London School of Medicine for Women and the Royal Free Hospital and became the first female doctor in the state of Bloemfontein, South Africa, and Evelina, an activist for women's suffrage and an aid worker during World War I, who married Major Henry Haverfield. 

One of the two main family estates at this time (the other being the house that is today Inverlochy Castle Hotel) was Abinger Hall, at the foot of the North Downs in Abinger, Surrey. The third baron sold it in 1867 to a Mr Gwynne, who soon thereafter sold it to become the family seat of the statistician recently created first Lord Farrer, who rebuilt the house on that land.

Scarlett's first cousin once removed (downward), James Williams Scarlett, son of Sir William Anglin Scarlett, purchased the isle of Gigha, off the coast of Argyll, for £49,000 in 1865. His son, Lieutenant-Colonel William James Scarlett, then built the mansion house of Achamore there. Gigha remained in the family's hands until 1919.

References

Bibliography

External links

 http://www.thepeerage.com/p4805.htm

1826 births
1892 deaths
People educated at Eton College
Alumni of Trinity College, Cambridge
Companions of the Order of the Bath
Deputy Lieutenants of Inverness-shire
British Army lieutenant generals
Scots Guards officers
British Army personnel of the Crimean War
William
Eldest sons of British hereditary barons
Military personnel from Surrey